Richard M. DeVos may refer to:

 Dick DeVos (Richard Marvin DeVos, Jr., born 1955), businessman and Michigan politician
 Richard DeVos (Richard Marvin DeVos, Sr., 1926–2018), founder of Amway